The Headlight-Herald is a weekly paper published in Tillamook, Oregon, United States, since 1888. It is published on Wednesdays by Country Media and has a circulation of 7,486. It is the newspaper of record for Tillamook County.

History 
The Headlight, launched in 1888, is thought to have been Tillamook County's first newspaper. The Tillamook Advocate was founded in 1894, and used the plant previously owned by the Western Watchtower, a short-lived newspaper launched in political opposition to the Headlight in the late 1880s. After being purchased by R. M. Watson in 1895, the Advocate was renamed the Herald, and changed hands many times in the following years. The Headlight and the Herald merged in 1934 to form the Headlight-Herald.

References

External links
 Headlight-Herald (official website)

1888 establishments in Oregon
Newspapers published in Oregon
Oregon Newspaper Publishers Association
Publications established in 1888
Tillamook, Oregon